American Airlines Flight 1572 was a flight from Chicago O'Hare International Airport to Bradley International Airport on November 12, 1995. The McDonnell Douglas MD-83 struck trees and an instrument landing system (ILS) antenna during landing, causing $9 million in damage to the aircraft.

Aircraft
American Airlines Flight 1572 was a regularly scheduled passenger flight from O'Hare International Airport in Chicago, Illinois to Bradley International Airport near Hartford, Connecticut. On November 12, 1995, Flight 1572 was operated using a McDonnell Douglas MD-83, a twin-engine, narrow-body jet airliner (registration N566AA). The aircraft was equipped with two Pratt & Whitney JT8D-219 engines. The MD-83 had accumulated a total of 27,628 flight hours at the time of the accident.

Flight history
Flight 1572 was scheduled to depart from O'Hare at 21:25 Eastern Standard Time. Because of bad weather and delayed connecting passengers, however, the flight was delayed and did not depart until 23:05. While en route to Hartford, the flight crew, Captain Kenneth Lee (39), and First Officer John Richards (38), received an ACARS printout for the weather at Hartford.

While on descent into Hartford, the pilots received a weather update at 00:30 that included a warning of wind shear and severe thunderstorms at Bradley. At 00:34, the first officer checked the Automatic Terminal Information Service (ATIS) automated weather broadcast for Hartford, and noted to the captain that the most recent ATIS broadcast was about 90 minutes old. The captain checked the aircraft's weather radar before beginning the non-precision VOR approach to runway 15. Seeing no convective cells on the aircraft's path, he then turned the radar off.

At 00:49, while Flight 1572 was beginning its final approach, the crew was advised that the control tower was closing temporarily due to severe weather buckling a window inside the cab. The tower supervisor remained behind to assist the flight. The captain noticed the autopilot was having difficulty maintaining altitude and heading in the buffeting winds. Five miles from the airport the aircraft encountered heavy rain and some turbulence. As the crew began to look for the airport, the aircraft continued descending.

This information was not transmitted to the Bradley control tower until 00:57 and was not made available to the flight crew before landing.

Crash
At 00:55, the sink rate alarm went off, followed seconds later by a loud thump as the aircraft began shearing off treetops along Peak Mountain ridge. The captain advanced the throttles to full power, but the trees had been ingested into the engines causing them to flame out and shut down. The captain immediately lowered flaps to 40° hoping it would momentarily cause the aircraft to "balloon" upwards. While not standard operating procedure, this worked to a limited extent until the aircraft clipped a tree near the end of the runway. It then impacted the runway 33 ILS antenna equipment at the approach end of runway 15 before rolling to a stop.

The accident resulted in one minor injury to a passenger; the other 72 passengers and all 5 crew members escaped without injury. The accident resulted in $9 million in damage to the aircraft and over $74,000 in damage to airport equipment.

NTSB investigation
The National Transportation Safety Board investigated the accident.

The investigation cited several causes for this accident. It faulted the Federal Aviation Administration (FAA) for designing the approach to runway 15 without taking the ridgeline into consideration. It cited pilot error as the primary cause due to an incorrect altimeter setting combined with the crew's failure to level off at the MDA. The report also noted that because pressure was falling rapidly, the crew should have requested a more recent altimeter setting from the tower—the ATIS broadcast is normally updated hourly or whenever weather conditions change, and the first officer had noted that the ATIS recording was over 90 minutes old. Although turbulence, heavy rain, and wind shear affected the aircraft, the crew continued to allow it to descend while searching for the airport.

The cockpit voice recording of the incident became part of the script of a play called Charlie Victor Romeo. After the accident, N566AA was repaired and returned to service and continued to fly with American Airlines until being retired and stored in August 2017.

American Airlines continues to operate the Chicago-Windsor Locks route as American Airlines Flight 2070, using a Boeing 737. American still uses flight number 1572 on its Miami-Toronto and Toronto-Miami route using an Airbus A319.

In popular culture 
The incident was featured on season 22 of the Canadian documentary series Mayday, in the episode titled "Tree Strike Terror".

References

External links 
CVR transcript American Airlines Flight 1572 on aviation-safety.net

1995 in Connecticut
Airliner accidents and incidents in Connecticut
1572
Accidents and incidents involving the McDonnell Douglas MD-83
Aviation accidents and incidents in 1995
Airliner accidents and incidents involving controlled flight into terrain
Disasters in Connecticut
Windsor Locks, Connecticut
Aviation accidents and incidents in the United States in 1995
November 1995 events in the United States
Airliner accidents and incidents caused by pilot error
Events in Hartford County, Connecticut